Managua is the capital city of Nicaragua.

Managua may also refer to:

Places
 Lake Managua, also known as Lake Xolotlán, a lake in Nicaragua
 Managua (department), a department in Nicaragua
 Managua International Airport, the main airport near the city
 Quepos Managua Airport, an airport in Costa Rica
 Managua, a community in Cuba south of Havana
 Managua Airport (Cuba), a military airport near Havana, Cuba

Others
 "Managua, Nicaragua" (song), a popular song in the 1940s sung by Guy Lombardo
 América Managua, a Nicaraguan football team
 Viva Managua Movement, a Nicaraguan political organisation
 Managua (film), a 1996 film starring Louis Gossett Jr.